Boschoord is a hamlet in the north-eastern Netherlands. It is located in the municipality of Westerveld, Drenthe.

It was first mentioned in 1846 as Kolonie No 7. It was founded as work colony of the Maatschappij van Weldadigheid. In 1907, it was named Boschoord, and Bosch is a reference to Johannes van de Bosch, the founder of Maatschappij van Weldadigheid. Landgoed Boschoord is still owned by the company, and has become a  nature area which consists of forest and moorland.

References 

Populated places in Drenthe
Westerveld